Mythimna pudorina, the striped wainscot, is a species of moth of the family Noctuidae. It is found in the Palearctic realm (Europe and all of Russia to Japan). Also Armenia, Asia Minor and eastern Siberia.

Technical description and variation

The wingspan is 35–38 mm. Forewing flesh coloured ochreous densely dusted with grey atoms; the veins slightly paler; the upper half of cell and of submedian interval often paler without dusting, the streak in cell continued to margin; sometimes a darker streak in lower half of cell also continued to termen; hindwing dark grey, with pale fringe; -impudens Hbn. is a less marked grey form, without reddish tinge;- rufescens Tutt is a rare British form, bright rosy red, with pale grey dusting; striata Tutt darker, with the grey intervals blackish.

Biology
The moth flies from June to August depending on the location.

Larva dirty yellowish white; dorsal line white; subdorsal also white, edged above with black; 3 fine whitish lateral lines and a narrow grey stripe containing the black spiracles. The larvae feed on various grasses, such as purple moor grass, Phragmites and reed canary grass.

References

External links

Striped wainscot at UKmoths
 Funet Taxonomy
Lepiforum.de
Vlindernet.nl 

Mythimna (moth)
Moths of Asia
Moths of Europe
Moths described in 1775